Kenneth James Clark, DSC (31 May 1922 – 29 January 2013) was Archdeacon of Swindon from 1982 to 1992.

He was educated at Watford Grammar School. After  Wartime service as a Submariner with the Royal Navy he completed his education at St Catherine's College, Oxford and Ripon College Cuddesdon. After  curacies in Brinkworth and Cricklade he was the Incumbent (ecclesiastical) of Holy Cross, Bristol from 1956 to 1961.  He was Vicar of Westbury-on-Trym from 1961 to 72; and of St Mary Redcliffe, Bristol from 1972 until his appointment as Archdeacon. He was a Member of the General Synod of the Church of England from 1980 to 1992.

References

1922 births
2013 deaths
Alumni of St Catherine's College, Oxford
Alumni of Ripon College Cuddesdon
Archdeacons of Swindon
Recipients of the Distinguished Service Cross (United Kingdom)
Royal Navy personnel of World War II
Members of the General Synod of the Church of England